The following lists events that happened during 1999 in Bosnia and Herzegovina.

Incumbents
Presidency:
Alija Izetbegović 
Ante Jelavić
Živko Radišić
Prime Minister: Haris Silajdžić

Events

December
 December 30 - Several areas in the northeast are declared a disaster zone when melting snow causes flooding and landslides.

References

 
Years of the 20th century in Bosnia and Herzegovina
1990s in Bosnia and Herzegovina
Bosnia and Herzegovina
Bosnia and Herzegovina